The Centre de liaison de l'enseignement et des médias d'information (CLEMI) - (Liaison Centre for Education and Media Information) is an agency of the French Ministry of Education in charge of media education across the education system. Based in Paris, it is led by France Renucci, a lecturer at the Paris-Sorbonne University and its advisory council and development are chaired by Jean-Marie Smith, a former journalist from Le Monde.

The CLEMI's mission is to teach students how they should approach the media. As a training center, it forms partnerships with professionals from the media industry.

It is associated with the Bibliothèque nationale de France and each year it publishes a press review formed from selected newspaper articles, with the support of the Foundation Varenne. It organizes, with the Varenne Foundation and the Jet d'encre association, a National Competition for school newspapers.

References

External links
 CLEMI (Centre de Liaison de l'Enseignement et des Médias d'Information) - Official website

Education in France